Desh Drohi may refer to:
 Deshdrohi, a 2008 Indian Hindi-language action thriller film
 Desh Drohi (1980 film), an Indian Hindi-language action film